Xiaoshan is one of ten urban districts of the prefecture-level city of Hangzhou, the capital of Zhejiang Province, East China. Xiaoshan was formerly a city in its own right, separated by the Qiantang River from Hangzhou proper, but the municipality was annexed by its more populous neighbor in 2001.
Xiaoshan has a permanent population with residential rights of around 1,511,000 and an additional non-permanent population of about 876,500. Most of the local residents are Han people who speak a local variety of Wu Chinese in addition to Mandarin Chinese. The area's history of human settlement dates back to more than 8000 years ago, as excavations at Xiaoshan's Kuahuqiao archeological site have shown. Xiaoshan's manufacturing-dominated economy has made it one of the most affluent metropolitan districts in China. In 2012 it had a GDP of 161.2 billion CNY, or around $17,000 per capita. Hangzhou's international airport, Hangzhou Xiaoshan International Airport, is located in western Xiaoshan, close to the mouth of Hangzhou Bay. The district is also at the center of one of China's local real estate booms, as the demand for newer, more upscale housing from China's growing middle class has led to an explosion in construction of new high-rise condominiums. In addition, Hangzhou Xiaoshan Sports Centre is also found in Xiaoshan.The local culture is deeply rooted in the area's communist character, and the Chinese Communist Party has a strong local presence and an estimated local membership of 250,000.

Administrative divisions
Subdistricts:
Chengxiang Subdistrict (城厢街道), Beigan Subdistrict (北干街道), Shushan Subdistrict (蜀山街道), Xintang Subdistrict (新塘街道)

Towns:
Louta (楼塔镇), Heshang (河上镇), Daicun (戴村镇), Puyang (浦阳镇), Jinhua (进化镇), Linpu (临浦镇), Yiqiao (义桥镇), Suoqian (所前镇), Yaqian (衙前镇), Wenyan (闻堰镇), Ningwei (宁围镇), Xinjie (新街镇), Kanshan (坎山镇), Guali (瓜沥镇), Dangshan (党山镇), Yinong (益农镇), Jingjiang (靖江镇), Nanyang (南阳镇), Yipeng (义蓬镇), Hezhuang (河庄镇), Dangwan (党湾镇), Xinwan (新湾镇)

Climate

Industry

Xiaoshan Economic & Technological Development Zone
Xiaoshan Economic & Technological Development Zone was established in 1990. Currently, it has formed leading industries including electronic communications, automobiles and auto parts, precision machinery, medical food, textiles, garments, chemical building materials.

Economy
Loong Airlines has its headquarters in the Loong Air Office Building on the property of Hangzhou Xiaoshan International Airport.

References

External links
  Official website of Xiaoshan government

 
Geography of Hangzhou
Districts of Zhejiang